The 1934–35 season was Manchester City's 40th season of competitive football and 28th season in the top division of English football. In addition to the First Division, the club competed in the FA Cup and the FA Charity Shield.

First Division

League table

Results summary

References

External links

Manchester City F.C. seasons